Slave to the Sword is the third album by American thrash metal band Exmortus. It was released on February 4, 2014 by Prosthetic Records.

Track listing

Credits
Exmortus
Jadran "Conan" Gonzalez – vocals, guitars
David Rivera – guitars
Clodoaldo Bibiano – bass
Mario Moreno – drums

Production
Zack Ohren – production, engineering
Philip Lawvere – artwork
Steve Hilson – layout
Kristin Brokaw – photography

References

2014 albums
Exmortus albums